António Manuel Pereira Xavier (born 6 July 1992) is a Portuguese professional footballer who plays for Greek Super League club Levadiakos, on loan from Panathinaikos, as a winger.

He achieved Primeira Liga totals of 177 games and eight goals for Marítimo, Paços de Ferreira, Tondela and Estoril.

Career
Born in Guimarães, Xavier spent his youth at hometown club Vitória S.C. before making his senior debut in the third division with G.D. Tourizense. After spells in the second with S.C. Braga B, C.D. Feirense and Leixões SC, he signed a four-year contract with C.S. Marítimo in July 2014.

On 27 August 2014, Xavier scored his first professional goal as Marítimo's reserves drew 1–1 at home to G.D. Chaves. In December, manager Leonel Pontes called him up for his first Primeira Liga match at home to G.D. Estoril Praia, and he played the full 90 minutes of the goalless draw. A week later, he was sent off in a 1–0 away loss against F.C. Arouca, with both of his yellow cards being for simulation.

Xavier scored his first top-flight goal on 15 February 2015, a penalty in a 4–3 comeback win at F.C. Penafiel. He remained a first-team player more often than not during his time in Madeira, until joining F.C. Paços de Ferreira in June 2017 on a three-year deal with his previous employer keeping some economic rights.

On 30 July 2017, Xavier scored on his debut as the Castores won 2–1 at Arouca in the second round of the Taça da Liga. It was his only goal during his year in the Furniture Capital, and following their relegation he moved to C.D. Tondela on a two-year contract in June 2018. On 23 September, he scored both goals of a home defeat of Moreirense FC, and two months later he netted a hat-trick in a 7–0 win over F.C. Vale Formoso in the last 32 of the Taça de Portugal.

Xavier moved abroad for the first time on 30 July 2020, joining Super League Greece side Panathinaikos F.C. on a free transfer for three years. Having played rarely in Athens, he returned home on 31 August the following year on loan to Estoril.

References

External links

1992 births
Living people
Sportspeople from Guimarães
Portuguese footballers
Association football wingers
Primeira Liga players
Liga Portugal 2 players
Segunda Divisão players
Vitória S.C. players
G.D. Tourizense players
S.C. Braga B players
C.D. Feirense players
Leixões S.C. players
C.S. Marítimo players
F.C. Paços de Ferreira players
C.D. Tondela players
G.D. Estoril Praia players
Super League Greece players
Panathinaikos F.C. players
Portuguese expatriate footballers
Expatriate footballers in Greece
Portuguese expatriate sportspeople in Greece